Diane Walker (born 2 October 1955) is a Scottish former swimmer. Walker competed in two events at the 1972 Summer Olympics. At the ASA National British Championships she won the National Championship 440 yards freestyle title in 1975,  the 200 metres medley title in 1973 and the 400 metres medley title in 1972 and 1973.

References

External links
 

1955 births
Living people
Scottish female swimmers
Olympic swimmers of Great Britain
Sportspeople from Aberdeen
Swimmers at the 1972 Summer Olympics
Place of birth missing (living people)
Female medley swimmers
Scottish female freestyle swimmers